Abroscopus is a small genus of "warbler" in the family Cettiidae, formerly included in the Sylviidae.

Species
It contains the following three species:

References
 del Hoyo, J.; Elliot, A. & Christie D. (editors). (2006). Handbook of the Birds of the World. Volume 11: Old World Flycatchers to Old World Warblers. Lynx Edicions. .

 
Bird genera
Taxa named by E. C. Stuart Baker
Taxonomy articles created by Polbot